A general election was held in the U.S. state of Iowa on November 4, 2014. All of Iowa's executive officers were up for election as well as a United States Senate seat, all four of Iowa's seats in the United States House of Representatives, 25 (half) of the seats in the Iowa Senate, and all 100 seats in the Iowa House of Representatives. Primary elections were held on June 3, 2014.

Governor and lieutenant governor

Incumbent Republican Governor Terry Branstad ran for re-election to a second consecutive and sixth overall term as governor.

He was challenged in the Republican primary by Tom Hoefling, a political activist and the America's Party and American Independent Party nominee for President in 2012.

State Senator Jack Hatch ran for the Democrats.

In Iowa, nominees for lieutenant governor are chosen at party conventions. They then run on a ticket with the gubernatorial nominee. Incumbent Republican Lieutenant Governor Kim Reynolds is running for re-election to a second term in office.

Attorney General
Incumbent Democratic Attorney General Tom Miller, who has served in the position since 1995, and previously from 1979 to 1991, ran for re-election to a sixth consecutive and ninth overall term in office.

Attorney and lobbyist, and future Lieutenant Governor of Iowa, Adam Gregg ran for the Republican Party.

Secretary of State
Incumbent Republican Secretary of State Matt Schultz, who has served in the position since 2011, did not run for re-election to a second term in office. He instead ran unsuccessfully for the Republican nomination for Iowa's 3rd congressional district.

Former Republican Secretary of State Paul Pate and Democratic political consultant and former gubernatorial aide Brad Anderson are running.

Treasurer
Incumbent Democratic State Treasurer Michael Fitzgerald, who has served in the position since 1983, is running for re-election to a ninth term in office.

The Republican nominee is Sam Clovis, a radio host who finished second in the Senate primary, before being nominated as the Republican candidate for treasurer.

Auditor
Incumbent Republican State Auditor Mary Mosiman, who was appointed to the position in 2013 after incumbent State Auditor David A. Vaudt resigned, is running for election to a first full term in office.

Attorney and former Des Moines School Board member Jon Neiderbach is running for the Democrats.

Secretary of Agriculture
Incumbent Republican Secretary of Agriculture Bill Northey, who has served in the position since 2007, is running for re-election to a third term in office.

Polk County Soil and Water Conservation District Commissioner Sherrie Taha is running for the Democrats.

United States Senate

Incumbent Democratic Senator Tom Harkin is retired rather than run for re-election to a sixth term in office.

U.S. Representative Bruce Braley was the only Democratic to file to run and thus the de facto nominee.

Five Republicans filed to run: radio host Sam Clovis, State Senator Joni Ernst, former CEO of Reliant Energy Mark Jacobs, businessman Scott Schaben and former U.S. Attorney for the Southern District of Iowa and nominee for Treasurer of Iowa in 2002 Matthew Whitaker.

United States House of Representatives

All of Iowa's four seats in the United States House of Representatives will be up for election in 2014 and are contested.

Iowa General Assembly

The 25 odd-numbered Iowa Senate seats are up for election in 2014, as are all 100 Iowa House seats.  As of the primary filing deadline for the two major parties, there are 11 Senate seats and 58 House seats that only have candidates from one party, though several of these seats have contested primaries.  These numbers are from the primary election candidate listing, so do not take into account candidates nominated by third parties, candidates nominated by petition, or candidates nominated by a major party after the primary.  Such candidates file during the general election filing period, which runs from July 28 – August 15, 2014.

References

 
Iowa